Vishwakarma Institute of Management(), or V.I.M as it is commonly abbreviated, was founded in 1991. 
It is a renowned institute which is affiliated to University of Pune.
It is recognized and approved by All India Council for Technical Education(AICTE), New Delhi.  Since 2001, the institute was affiliated to the University of Pune. It is also recognized by Government of Maharashtra And CRISIL has graded VIM's MBA programme with B*** at National Level and MH A at State Level. 
The institute is also the recipient of the 19th Dewang Mehta B School Award for the Best B School with Academic Inputs in Marketing. In 2013 the institute has been honored with the "Second Best Professional Institute in Urban Area" by University of Pune.

Courses

Postgraduate
MBA (Master of Business Administration)
PhD  (Doctor of Philosophy)

Research Cell 

The research cell was established with the objective to create a culture of research led academic excellence through rigorous, interdisciplinary research resulting in dissemination of knowledge in the complex management domain. The institute funds all the research activity. It has published various papers on various topics and have presented it in various conferences and seminars and VIM also organizes a National Conference every year.
Vishwakarma Business Review (VBR) is the management journal of Vishwakarma Institute of Management, Pune. Along with this the research cell also publishes students mini research projects in a publication called "Samshodhan".

Intrigue
Every year VIM hosts a National Event called "Intrigue".
This Fiesta stands apart from other management events as it holds the distinction of being the only Management event for the students which emphasizes on the educational aspects and organizes management games in such a manner to ensure learning with fun.
VIM has witnessed five versions in the form of INTRiGUE 1.0 (2009) with the theme of ‘Battle Field’, INTRiGUE 2.0 (2010) with the theme of ‘Race Track’ and INTRiGUE 3.0 (2011) with the theme of ‘The Jungle’. The theme for INTRiGUE 4.0 (2012) was ‘World Economy’ to sense the current hassled economy around the globe which shall trigger zest among the budding managers to grab concealed opportunities. And in 2013 INTRiGUE was back with its 5.0 version with the theme 'Indus Valley'.

Students of VIM organize the complete event and a Design-Plan-Organize-Direct-Control model is adopted and executed by the students. Delegated committees included Office committee, Decoration, Promotion, Finance, Distribution and specialized ones for organizing individual events (games).

Entrepreneurship Development Cell 
Entrepreneurship Development Cell or ED-CELL was launched in August 2010. VIM ED-CELL provides the potential entrepreneurs  with a platform to develop and hone their skills as entrepreneurs via its activities like conducting seminars and workshops.
VIM tied up with NEN or National Entrepreneurship Network, established in 2003 by Romesh Wadhwani of Wadhwani Foundation with a mission to create and support growth of entrepreneurs, driving job-creation and economic growth in India. NEN’s model for advancing entrepreneurship rests firmly on its partnership approach, making it both scalable and effective. NEN's dream of an entrepreneurial India has been popularized worldwide by its annual entrepreneurial celebration called E-week, which is celebrated in VIM every year.

IBM Business Analytics Lab

International Business Machines Corporation, or IBM and Vishwakarma Institute of Management (VIM), Pune have partnered for a program initiated by Career Education for Business Transformation (CEBT) focuses on the major areas of business transformation where software plays a critical role and skills in areas of managerial decision making and strategy.

IBM provides relevant software for CEBT trainings, to address the increasing need for T Shaped skills in the global market place. The program brings together the latest software content, real-world industry experiences, hands on lab course, best practices and case studies all into a single unique education program.

Yojaka

Yojaka is an annual newsletter published by Vishwakarma Institute of Management, Pune. First published in 2009, copies of Yojaka are given to all the students on campus and soft copies are mailed to several thousand alumni and uploaded on the college website.  VIM Newsletter packages and presents the entire gamut of co-curricular and extra-curricular activities, faculty initiatives, achievements, editorials, guest articles by faculty and maintaining events calendar.

Gallery

References

External links
Official website
List of educational institutions in Pune

Business schools in Maharashtra
Colleges affiliated to Savitribai Phule Pune University
Universities and colleges in Pune
Educational institutions established in 1991
1991 establishments in Maharashtra